The Ningbo−Zhoushan Expressway, commonly referred to as the Yongzhou Expressway is an expressway in Zhejiang, China which links Ningbo to Zhoushan. In the National Trunk Highway System (NTHS) in China, the number of this highway is G9211.

The expressway derives its name from the combination of two one-character Chinese abbreviations of both Ningbo and Zhoushan (Ningbo−Yong, Zhoushan−Zhou). Starting from the Qianyang hub on the G1501 Ningbo Ring Expressway and ending on the National Highway G329 at Yadanshan Dock, the road can be divided into two parts. The first section which was opened to traffic at the end of 2010, starts from the Qianyang hub and ends at the Jiaochuan hub, which is shared with the G1501 Ningbo Ring Expressway. The second section starts from the Jiaochuan hub and ends at the Yadanshan Dock. It contains 5 cross-sea bridges, and was opened to traffic on December 25, 2009.

Construction history 
The section from Jiaochuan to Yadanshan was called The Project Connecting Zhoushan Islands and Mainland, which have a length of 48 kilometers, the largest project that connects islands with mainland in China. The first phase of the project began construction in September 1999 and open to traffic on January 1, 2006. It comprises three bridges: Cengang Bridge, Xiangjiaomen Bridge and Taoyaomen Bridge. The second phase was endorsed by NDRC in China and began construction on May 20. On December 25, 2009, both phases was open to traffic. The section from Qianyang to Baoguosi have a length of 7 kilometers, began construction in 2005 and finished on December 26, 2007. The section from Baoguosi to Jiaochuanhave a length of 13 kilometers, began construction on February 27, 2008 and finished in the end of 2010.

Cross-sea bridges 
Yongzhou Expressway comprises 5 cross-sea bridges connecting Zhoushan Island, Lidiao Island, Fuchi Island, Cezi Island, Jintang Island and the mainland.  Jintang Bridge is the third longest cross-sea bridge in China, after Hangzhou Bay Bridge and Donghai Bridge. It is also the longest cable-stayed bridge built on the sea. Xihoumen Bridge is the second longest suspension bridge in the world, after the Akashi-Kaikyo Bridge in Japan.

Cengang bridge 
Cengang bridge is the first bridge in the project. Crossing Cengang waterway, the bridge connects Zhoushan Island with Lidiao Island. The length of the bridge is 793 meters and the bridge has 4 lanes of traffic.

Xiangjiaomen Bridge 
Xiangjiaomen Bridge, the second bridge in the project, crosses Xiangjiaomen waterway.  The bridge connects Lidiao Island with Fuchi Island. With a length of 951 meters and four lanes of traffic, the bridge has a span of 150 meters. Ships of up to 500 tons of displacement can navigate under the bridge safely.

Taoyaomen Bridge 

Taoyaomen Bridge is the third bridge in the project. Ships of up to 2000 tons of displacement can navigate under the bridge safely.

Xihoumen Bridge 

Xihoumen Bridge is the fourth bridge in the project. The construction work began on May, 2004. The bridge is designed as a suspension bridge and it has the second longest span in the world. Ships of up to 30000 tons of displacement can go navigate under the bridge safely.

Jintang Bridge 

Jintang Bridge, the fifth in order is the longest in length of all the bridges in the project. The length of the bridge is 18.5 kilometers. It is the third longest cross-sea bridge built in China. Major ships pass in between the two 620 meter high bridge towers.  Ships of up to 50000 tons of displacement can navigate under the bridge safely.

Accidents involving ships 
Bridges in Yongzhou Expressway are built on straits near the Port of Ningbo, where there is a high volume of sea traffic. Three collisions occurred during the construction of the expressway. On March 28, 2008, a cargo ship registered in Taizhou collided with Jintang Bridge. Part of the bridge was destroyed and four people were killed by falling debris. On January 6, 2009, a construction ship registered in Lianyungang collided with the Taoyaomen Bridge, however, there was no significant damage. On November 16, a ship from South Korea collided with the Jintang Bridge. Though the damage was only minor, the accident delayed the opening of the expressway from November 22 until December 25.

Controversies

Island entrance fee 
After the expressway was opened to traffic, every vehicle traveling on the expressway from Jiaochuan to Zhoushan was required to pay RMB 10 as the Zhoushan Island Vehicle Fee (also called island entrance fee by local residents). It raised disputes in Zhoushan. The administrators state that this fee is used for compensating the construction expenditure of roads in Zhoushan, especially the expressway. As of June 2010, Zhoushan residents are free from this toll, but vehicles from other regions still need to pay the fee.

Speed limitations 
Given the road condition, the speed limitation from Zhoushan to Lidiao toll gate is 60 km/h while the speed limitation from Lidiao to Cezi toll gate is 80 km/h, which also raises dispute because of the high toll. It is said that the expressway is now under maintenance for higher speed.

Route 

{| class="wikitable plainrowheaders"
|+ 
! scope="col" | Location
! scope="col" | km
! scope="col" | Number
! scope="col" | Name
! scope="col" | Destination
! scope="col" width="50%" | Notes
|-
| rowspan="8" | Dinghai District,Zhoushan
| 0 
| (1)
|  Zhoushan (舟山)Also known asShaungqiao (双桥)
|  National Highway 329
| 
|-
| 11
| (2)
| style="background-color: #ffffff" | Cengang (岑港)
| Xicen Line
| Only available for vehicles heading to Ningbo. No exits available.
|-
| 12
| (3)
| colspan="2" | Lidiao Island (里钓)
| Cengang Bridge connects Cengang and Lidiao Island. Only available for vehicles coming from Ningbo direction (exit) or heading to Ningbo (entrance).
|-
| 13
| (4)
| colspan="2" | Fuchi Island (富翅)
| Xiangjiaomen Bridge connects Lidiao Island and Fuchi Island
|-
| 13
| (5)
| Cezi (册子)
| Beitao Line
| Taoyaomen Bridge connects Fuchi Island and Cezi Island
|-
| 16
| (6)
| Jintang (金塘)
| Dongdong Line
| Xihoumen Bridge connects Cezi Island and Jintang
|-
| 16
| 
| colspan="2" | Jintang Service Area (金塘服务区)
| Jitang Service Area locates outside the toll area of the expressway. It provides a panoramic view of Xihoumen Bridge as well as a museum exhibiting the construction process and techniques used in building these cross-sea bridges.
|-
| 20
| (7)
| Ligang (沥港)
| Road towards Jintang Harbor 
| 
|-
| rowspan="4" | Zhenhai District,Ningbo
| style="background-color: #ddffdd" | 48
| style="background-color: #ddffdd" | (8)
| style="background-color: #ddffdd" | Jiaochuan (蛟川)
| style="background-color: #ddffdd" |  Ningbo Ring Expressway East Outer Ring RoadZhenhai Avenue
| style="background-color: #ddffdd" | Jintang Bridge connects Jiaochuan and Ligang. Concurrency with G1501 Ningbo Ring Expressway starts in this station.
|-
| style="background-color: #ddffdd" | 54
| style="background-color: #ddffdd" | (9)
| style="background-color: #ddffdd" | Shahe (沙河)
| style="background-color: #ddffdd" | Century Avenue
| style="background-color: #ddffdd" | 
|-
| style="background-color: #ddffdd" | 54
| style="background-color: #ddffdd" | 
| style="background-color: #ddffdd" colspan="2" | Zhenhai Service Area (镇海服务区)
| style="background-color: #ddffdd" | Zhenhai Service Area and Shahe exit shares one exit.
|-
| style="background-color: #ddffdd" | 58
| style="background-color: #ddffdd" | (10)
| style="background-color: #ddffdd" | Jiulong Lake (九龙湖)
| style="background-color: #ddffdd" | Jiulong Avenue
| style="background-color: #ddffdd" | 
|-
| rowspan="2" | Jiangbei District,Ningbo
| style="background-color: #ddffdd" | 61
| style="background-color: #ddffdd" | (11)
| style="background-color: #ddffdd" | Baoguo Temple
| style="background-color: #ddffdd" | Ningbo Airport Highway (unbuilt)
| style="background-color: #ddffdd" | 
|-
| style="background-color: #ddffdd" | 68
| style="background-color: #ddffdd" | (12)
| style="background-color: #ddffdd" | Ningbo North (宁波北)Also known asQianyang (前洋)
| style="background-color: #ddffdd" |  Shenhai Expressway Hangzhou Bay Ring Expressway Ningbo Ring Expressway North Outer Ring Road
| style="background-color: #ddffdd" | Concurrency with G1501 Ningbo Ring Expressway ends in this station. This station also concurrent with G15 Shenyang-Haikou Expressway and G92 Hangzhou Bay Ring Expressway.

References 

Chinese national-level expressways
Expressways in Zhejiang
Zhoushan
Transport in Ningbo